The Montgomery County Circuit Courthouses are part of the Montgomery County Judicial Center located in downtown Rockville, Maryland. The Red Brick Courthouse, located at 29 Courthouse Square, houses the refurbished Grand Courtroom; the newer Circuit Court building, located at 50 Maryland Avenue, houses the remainder of the county's justice system.

Circuit Court for Montgomery County building
The Montgomery County Judicial Center, a Brutalist building constructed in the 1980s, houses the Montgomery County Circuit Court, the Offices of the Sheriff, the Register of wills, the Orphans' Court and the State's Attorney for Montgomery County.  The Judicial Center and District Court buildings, together with the Rockville City Hall are located in downtown Rockville, Maryland, at the corner of Maryland Avenue and Jefferson Street (Rte 28). The District Court is on the west side of Maryland Avenue, across the street from the Judicial Center.

History
There have been four court houses in Rockville since it was established as the County seat in 1776.  Court was originally held at the Hungerford Tavern until a frame court house was erected in the 1790s.  By 1810, a new court house was needed.  In 1835 the General Assembly authorized a new brick court house and then again in 1890, the later which was built in a Romanesque Revival style.  In 1931 the grey Neoclassical style courthouse was constructed and connected to the 1890 court house to suit the county's growing population.  The grey courthouse now serves as home to the District Court of Maryland for Montgomery County.

From 1927 to 1954, the lower level of the courthouse served as the headquarters of the Montgomery County Police Department.

Historic District

There are several buildings listed on the National Register of Historic Places within the area; they all make up the Montgomery County Courthouse Historic District, which was designated in 1986. The district is focused on what remains of Rockville's old commercial, governmental, and residential center, most of which was demolished during urban renewal in the 1960s. The district includes two county courthouses, the 1891 red brick Romanesque Revival structure and the 1931 Neo-classical granite building with a 1960s addition, the 1939 Georgian-styled Post Office of limestone construction, and the 1930 Art Deco stone structure built for the Farmers Banking and Trust Company.  It extends over an area of two city blocks. The 1891 courthouse was designed by prominent Baltimore architect Frank E. Davis.

References

External links
, including photo in 1975, at Maryland Historical Trust website

County courthouses in Maryland
Government buildings completed in 1891
Romanesque Revival architecture in Maryland
Buildings and structures in Rockville, Maryland
Historic districts on the National Register of Historic Places in Maryland
Courthouses on the National Register of Historic Places in Maryland
National Register of Historic Places in Montgomery County, Maryland